Silla Pata (Aymara silla cane of maize, pata step, "maize cane step") is a  mountain in the Cordillera Real in the Andes of Bolivia. It is located in the La Paz Department, Murillo Province, Palca Municipality. Silla Pata lies in the southern part of the Illimani massif. It is situated south-east of the highest point of the massif and Layqa Qullu and south-west of Link'u Link'u.

References 

Mountains of La Paz Department (Bolivia)